John D. Niles (born 1945) is an American scholar of medieval English literature best known for his work on Beowulf and the theory of oral literature.

Career

A graduate of the University of California, Berkeley, where he received his higher degrees (B.A. in English, 1967; PhD in Comparative Literature, 1972), Niles taught for an initial four years as Assistant Professor of English at Brandeis University. He then was invited to join the faculty of the Department of English at the University of California, Berkeley, where he remained for twenty-six years until taking early retirement. In 2001 he joined the faculty of the University of Wisconsin–Madison, where he taught for ten years in the Department of English, was named the Frederic G. Cassidy Professor of Humanities, and was a Senior Fellow at the UW Institute for the Humanities. After his retirement from UW-Madison in 2011 he has remained active in research as Professor Emeritus at both UC Berkeley and UW-Madison. 

Niles is the author of eight books on Old English literature and related topics. He has edited or co-edited another nine books, in addition to upwards of sixty scholarly articles and other publications. During the 1980s he conducted extensive fieldwork into singing and storytelling traditions in Scotland, particularly among Scottish Gypsy and Traveller Groups, including the noted storyteller Duncan Williamson. This research resulted in his 1997 book Homo Narrans: The Poetics and Anthropology of Oral Literature. In 2005 he taught a seminar at the Newberry Library, Chicago on the early history of Old English studies. This became the kernel of his 2015 book The Idea of Anglo-Saxon England 1066-1901, a sustained account of the history of Anglo-Saxon studies. His researches into the archaeology and prehistory of early Northwest Europe led to the joint publication Beowulf and Lejre (2007). This features a mine of information about the prehistoric Danish site (at the present-day hamlet of Lejre, Zealand) where much of the imagined action of Beowulf is set. His 2019 book God’s Exiles and English Verse: On the Exeter Anthology of Old English Poetry is the first integrative book-length critical study of the earliest anthology of English-language poetry, a late-tenth-century collection that includes such poems as The Wanderer and The Seafarer.

In 2022, Niles was the honorand of a collection of articles, first published as a special issue of the journal Humanities, and subsequently as the book Old English Poetry and Its Legacy.

Selected publications

Monographs
Beowulf: The Poem and Its Tradition (Harvard University Press, 1983). .
Homo Narrans: The Poetics and Anthropology of Oral Literature (University of Pennsylvania Press, 1999). ,
Old English Enigmatic Poems and the Play of the Texts (Brepols, 2006). .
Old English Heroic Poems and the Social Life of Texts (Brepols, 2007). .
Beowulf and Lejre (Arizona Center for Medieval and Renaissance Studies, 2007) - with Tom Christensen and Marijane Osborn. .
The Idea of Anglo-Saxon England 1066-1901: Remembering, Forgetting, Deciphering, and Renewing the Past (Wiley-Blackwell, 2015). .
Old English Literature: A Guide to Criticism with Selected Readings (Wiley-Blackwell, 2016). .
God’s Exiles and English Verse: On the Exeter Anthology of Old English Poetry (University of Exeter Press, 2019). .

Edited collections
Old English Literature in Context: Ten Essays (Boydell and Brewer, 1980). .
A Beowulf Handbook (University of Nebraska Press, 1997) - with Robert E. Bjork. .
Anglo-Saxonism and the Construction of Social Identity (University Press of Florida, 1997) - with Allen J. Frantzen. .
Beowulf: An Illustrated Edition, featuring [Seamus Heaney]'s translation of the poem (W.W. Norton, 2007). .
Klaeber’s Beowulf, 4th edition (University of Toronto Press, 2008) - with R.D. Fulk and Robert E. Bjork. .
The Genesis of Books: Studies in the Scribal Culture of Medieval England in Honour of A.N. Doane (Brepols, 2011) - with Matthew T. Hussey. .
Anglo-Saxon England and the Visual Imagination (Arizona Center for Medieval and Renaissance Studies, 2016) - with Stacy S. Klein and Jonathan Wilcox. .

References

External links
Faculty page at University of Wisconsin–Madison
Faculty page at University of California, Berkeley

Living people
University of California, Berkeley alumni
University of Wisconsin–Madison faculty
Anglo-Saxon studies scholars
1945 births
Brandeis University faculty
University of California, Berkeley faculty